Shor's algorithm is a quantum computer algorithm for finding the prime factors of an integer. It was developed in 1994 by the American mathematician Peter Shor.

Specifically, it takes quantum gates of order  using fast multiplication, or even  utilizing the asymptotically fastest multiplication algorithm currently known due to Harvey and Van Der Hoven, thus demonstrating that the integer factorization problem can be efficiently solved on a quantum computer and is consequently in the complexity class BQP. This is almost exponentially faster than the most efficient known classical factoring algorithm, the general number field sieve, which works in sub-exponential time: . The efficiency of Shor's algorithm is due to the efficiency of the quantum Fourier transform, and modular exponentiation by repeated squarings.

If a quantum computer with a sufficient number of qubits could operate without succumbing to quantum noise and other quantum-decoherence phenomena, then Shor's algorithm could be used to break public-key cryptography schemes, such as

 The RSA scheme
 The Finite Field Diffie-Hellman key exchange
 The Elliptic Curve Diffie-Hellman key exchange

RSA is based on the assumption that factoring large integers is computationally intractable. As far as is known, this assumption is valid for classical (non-quantum) computers; no classical algorithm is known that can factor integers in polynomial time. However, Shor's algorithm shows that factoring integers is efficient on an ideal quantum computer, so it may be feasible to defeat RSA by constructing a large quantum computer. It was also a powerful motivator for the design and construction of quantum computers, and for the study of new quantum-computer algorithms. It has also facilitated research on new cryptosystems that are secure from quantum computers, collectively called post-quantum cryptography.

In 2001, Shor's algorithm was demonstrated by a group at IBM, who factored  into , using an NMR implementation of a quantum computer with  qubits. After IBM's implementation, two independent groups implemented Shor's algorithm using photonic qubits, emphasizing that multi-qubit entanglement was observed when running the Shor's algorithm circuits. In 2019 an attempt was made to factor the number  using Shor's algorithm on an IBM Q System One, but the algorithm failed because of accumulating errors. Though larger numbers have been factored by quantum computers using other algorithms, these algorithms are similar to classical brute-force checking of factors, so unlike Shor's algorithm, they are not expected to ever perform better than classical factoring algorithms.

Procedure 
Before attempting to find such a divisor, if there's any doubt whether  is composite or prime, one can use relatively quick primality-testing algorithms to verify that  is indeed composite, although this is not a part of Shor's algorithm.

Shor's algorithm consists of two parts:

 A reduction, which can be done on a classical computer, of the factoring problem to the problem of order-finding.
 A quantum algorithm to solve the order-finding problem.

This idea is similar to other factoring algorithms, such as the quadratic sieve, and a more detailed explanation can be found in the Explanation section below. Before starting the algorithm, it is imperative to check  to be odd (otherwise  is a divisor) and not to be any power of an integer (otherwise that integer is a divisor), so as to guarantee the existence of a non-trivial square root  of  modulo .

The quantum algorithm is used for finding the period of randomly chosen elements , as this is a difficult problem on a classical computer.

Classical part 

Quantum part: period-finding subroutine 

Given value , a value  is chosen such that . Such a value of  implies that . Therefore, these registers have  qubits each. Using what might appear to be twice as many qubits as necessary guarantees that there are at least  different values of  that produce the same , even as the period  approaches . The following uses bra-ket notation to denote quantum states.

Proceed as follows:

Explanation of the algorithm 
The algorithm is composed of two parts. The first part of the algorithm turns the factoring problem into the problem of finding the period of a function and may be implemented classically. The second part finds the period using the quantum Fourier transform and is responsible for the quantum speedup.

Non-trivial square root of [1 modulo N]
Shor's algorithm hinges on finding a non-trivial square root of  modulo ; That is, a solution to 

where .

In fact, if

If, on the other hand, then by Bézout's identity, there are integers  such that

Therefore, for Shor's algorithm to work, we need  to be odd (otherwise  is a divisor) and not to be any power of an odd prime (otherwise that prime is a divisor). This check, however, cannot rule out that  may be an odd prime itself, which can only be ruled out by primality-testing algorithms.

Obtaining factors from period 
By the end of step 3, we have an integer  in this group. As the group is finite,  must have a finite order , which is the smallest positive integer such that

Therefore,  divides  (also written ). Suppose that we are able to obtain  and that it is even. If , then by step 6, we have to restart the algorithm with a different random number .

Finding the period 
Shor's period-finding algorithm relies heavily on the ability of a quantum computer to be in many states simultaneously.

Physicists call this behavior a "superposition" of states. To compute the period of a function , we evaluate the function at all points simultaneously.

Quantum physics does not allow us to access all this information directly, however. A measurement will yield only one of all possible values, destroying all others. Measuring  on these states would provide different  values which give the same , leading to the period. Because we cannot make exact copies of a quantum state, this method does not work. Therefore, we have to carefully transform the superposition to another state that will return the correct answer with high probability. This is achieved by the quantum Fourier transform.

Shor thus had to solve three "implementation" problems.

 Create a superposition of states. This can be done by applying Hadamard gates to all qubits in the input register. Another approach would be to use the quantum Fourier transform (see below).
 Implement the function  as a quantum transform. To achieve this, Shor used repeated squaring for his modular exponentiation transformation. It is important to note that this step is more difficult to implement than the quantum Fourier transform, in that it requires ancillary qubits and substantially more gates to accomplish.
 Perform a quantum Fourier transform. By using controlled rotation gates and Hadamard gates, Shor designed a circuit for the quantum Fourier transform (with ) that uses just  gates.

After all these transformations, a measurement will yield an approximation to the period . For simplicity assume that there is a  such that  is an integer. To see this, we notice that then

for all integers .

The period-finding routine can be considered a variation of the more general quantum phase estimation algorithm to determine the eigenvalue of a unitary corresponding to an eigenvector. In the case of the period-finding routine used in Shor's Algorithm, the unitary in question is modular multiplication by the chosen base mod . While the computational basis  is not an eigenvector of this unitary, it is a uniform superposition of its  eigenvectors and thus the measurement will give the eigenvalue's phase for one of the eigenvectors. Since not all such phases can be used to extract the period, the retries of the subroutine may be necessary.

The bottleneck 
The runtime bottleneck of Shor's algorithm is quantum modular exponentiation, which is by far slower than the quantum Fourier transform and classical pre-/post-processing. There are several approaches to constructing and optimizing circuits for modular exponentiation. The simplest and (currently) most practical approach is to mimic conventional arithmetic circuits with reversible gates, starting with ripple-carry adders. Knowing the base and the modulus of exponentiation facilitates further optimizations. Reversible circuits typically use on the order of  gates for  qubits. Alternative techniques asymptotically improve gate counts by using quantum Fourier transforms, but are not competitive with fewer than 600 qubits owing to high constants.

Discrete logarithms 
Consider the abelian group , where each factor corresponds to modular addition of values. Now, consider the function

This gives us an abelian hidden subgroup problem, as  corresponds to a group homomorphism. So, if we can find the kernel, we can find . A quantum algorithm for solving this problem exists. This algorithm is, like the factor-finding algorithm, due to Peter Shor and both are implemented by creating a superposition through using Hadamard gates, followed by implementing  as a quantum transform, followed finally by a quantum Fourier transform. Due to this, the quantum algorithm for computing the discrete logarithm is also occasionally referred to as "Shor's Algorithm."

The order-finding problem can also be viewed as a hidden subgroup problem. To see this, consider the group of integers under addition, and for a given  such that: , the function

For any finite abelian group G, a quantum algorithm exists for solving the hidden subgroup for G in polynomial time.

See also 
 GEECM, a factorization algorithm said to be "often much faster than Shor's"
 Grover's algorithm

References

Further reading 
 .
 Phillip Kaye, Raymond Laflamme, Michele Mosca, An introduction to quantum computing, Oxford University Press, 2007, 
 "Explanation for the man in the street" by Scott Aaronson, "approved" by Peter Shor. (Shor wrote "Great article, Scott! That’s the best job of explaining quantum computing to the man on the street that I’ve seen."). An alternate metaphor for the QFT was presented in one of the comments. Scott Aaronson suggests the following 12 references as further reading (out of "the 10105000 quantum algorithm tutorials that are already on the web."):
 . Revised version of the original paper by Peter Shor ("28 pages, LaTeX. This is an expanded version of a paper that appeared in the Proceedings of the 35th Annual Symposium on Foundations of Computer Science, Santa Fe, NM, Nov. 20--22, 1994. Minor revisions made January, 1996").
 Quantum Computing and Shor's Algorithm, Matthew Hayward's Quantum Algorithms Page, 2005-02-17, imsa.edu, LaTeX2HTML version of the original LaTeX document, also available as PDF or postscript document.
 Quantum Computation and Shor's Factoring Algorithm, Ronald de Wolf, CWI and University of Amsterdam, January 12, 1999, 9 page postscript document.
 Shor's Factoring Algorithm, Notes from Lecture 9 of Berkeley CS 294–2, dated 4 Oct 2004, 7 page postscript document.
 Chapter 6 Quantum Computation, 91 page postscript document, Caltech, Preskill, PH229.
 Quantum computation: a tutorial by Samuel L. Braunstein.
 The Quantum States of Shor's Algorithm, by Neal Young, Last modified: Tue May 21 11:47:38 1996.
 III. Breaking RSA Encryption with a Quantum Computer: Shor's Factoring Algorithm, Lecture notes on Quantum computation, Cornell University, Physics 481–681, CS 483; Spring, 2006 by N. David Mermin. Last revised 2006-03-28, 30 page PDF document.
 
   This paper is a written version of a one-hour lecture given on Peter Shor's quantum factoring algorithm. 22 pages.
 Chapter 20 Quantum Computation, from Computational Complexity: A Modern Approach, Draft of a book: Dated January 2007, Sanjeev Arora and Boaz Barak, Princeton University. Published as Chapter 10 Quantum Computation of Sanjeev Arora, Boaz Barak, "Computational Complexity: A Modern Approach", Cambridge University Press, 2009, 
 A Step Toward Quantum Computing: Entangling 10 Billion Particles, from "Discover Magazine", Dated January 19, 2011.
 Josef Gruska - Quantum Computing Challenges also in Mathematics unlimited: 2001 and beyond, Editors Björn Engquist, Wilfried Schmid, Springer, 2001,

External links
 Version 1.0.0 of libquantum: contains a C language implementation of Shor's algorithm with their simulated quantum computer library, but the width variable in shor.c should be set to 1 to improve the runtime complexity.
 PBS Infinite Series created two videos explaining the math behind Shor's algorithm, "How to Break Cryptography" and "Hacking at Quantum Speed with Shor's Algorithm".

Quantum algorithms
Integer factorization algorithms
Post-quantum cryptography